Coragyps is a genus of New World vulture that contains the black vulture (Coragyps atratus) and two extinct relatives.

The genus Coragyps was introduced in 1853 by the French naturalist Emmanuel Le Maout to accommodate the black vulture. The name combines the Ancient Greek korax meaning "raven" with gups meaning "vulture".
 
One extinct species is the 'western' black vulture, Coragyps occidentalis, a larger ancestral relative of the modern species which lived in North America during much of the Pleistocene epoch; however, genetic evidence indicates that C. occidentalis may not be a true species of its own, as it is nested within the modern black vulture. 
The other is the Cuban black vulture, Coragyps seductus, known from the Pleistocene of Cuba.

References

Bird genera
Bird genera with one living species
Cathartidae